Billy Arnold may refer to:

 Billy Arnold (baseball) (1851–1899), American baseball player
 Billy Arnold (basketball) (b. 1940s), American college basketball player
 Billy Arnold (boxer) (1926–1995), American boxer
 Billy Arnold (racing driver) (1905–1976), American racing driver
 Billy Boy Arnold (born 1935), American blues harmonica player, singer and songwriter

See also 
 Bill Arnold (disambiguation)
 William Arnold (disambiguation)